Subtense Valley is a mostly ice-free valley, 1.5 nautical miles (2.8 km) long, located 2 nautical miles (3.7 km) northwest of Tabular Mountain in the west extremity of Quartermain Mountains, Victoria Land. The name is one of a group in the area associated with surveying applied in 1993 by New Zealand Geographic Board (NZGB). A subtense bar is a fixed base (usually 2 meters long) used in conjunction with a theodolite in the calculation of horizontal distance.

References

Valleys of Victoria Land
McMurdo Dry Valleys